is a Japanese track and field athlete. He competed at the 1928 Summer Olympics in the pole vault and decathlon and finished in sixth and 22nd place, respectively. He was the flag bearer for Japan at those Olympics.

He also competed for Japan at the Far Eastern Championship Games (a forerunner to the Asian Games) and was the winner of the pole vault competition in 1923 in Osaka and again in 1927.

References

1903 births
1984 deaths
Japanese decathletes
Japanese male pole vaulters
Japanese male high jumpers
Olympic male pole vaulters
Olympic decathletes
Olympic athletes of Japan
Athletes (track and field) at the 1928 Summer Olympics
Japan Championships in Athletics winners
20th-century Japanese people